Behnam Asbaghi Khanghah (born June 25, 1986 in Tehran, Iran) is an Iranian taekwondo practitioner. He won the gold medal in the featherweight division (-68 kg) at the 2013 World Taekwondo Championships in Puebla  and the 2014 Asian Games in Incheon, South Korea.

References

External links
 

Iranian male taekwondo practitioners
1986 births
Living people
Asian Games gold medalists for Iran
Asian Games medalists in taekwondo
Taekwondo practitioners at the 2014 Asian Games
Medalists at the 2014 Asian Games
World Taekwondo Championships medalists
Asian Taekwondo Championships medalists
21st-century Iranian people